Torta della nonna (from Italian: grandmother's cake) is a dessert typical of the region of Tuscany in Italy. The cake became a classic, offered in the vast majority of restaurants, especially in the 80s and 90s of the 20th century.

Description 
Torta della nonna originated in Arezzo, a commune in Tuscany. It is a sweet pastry cake filled with vanilla-flavored custard and covered with pine nuts and confectioner's sugar. The creamy filling is toned with fresh lemon zest. A flat pie pan or a taller springform pan can be used to bake the cake. Torta di nonna is available throughout Italy and is very popular in Sardinia. The cake is usually served as the last course of the classic Italian Sunday meal.

History 
Due to its popularity in restaurants, the origin of this dessert has been debated. According to some, the true origin of this dessert can be traced to the Arezzo region, while others point to a more recent Florentine origin. Some sources say that the cake was born from a bet of Guido Samorini, a Florentine cook and restaurateur. According to the most common version, some customers, tired of the few desserts that the restaurant's kitchen offered, asked him for a surprise for the following week. Samorini presented them with the Torta de la nonna "that was so pleasing for its taste and novelty". A passage from Pellegrino Artusi however, casts doubt on the veracity of the story, and hints that the cake already existed many years earlier; the writers describes the cake saying: "...I found the dessert with pine nuts and custard a pleasant pastry, a mediocre shortbread...".

One variation of this dessert is torta del nonno, with includes cocoa, and almonds instead of pine nuts. Other variations include the addition of cherries inside the custard filling.

References 

Italian cakes
Cuisine of Tuscany
Custard desserts